This is a list of binomial names in the genus Lejeunea, with just accepted species and not including synonyms.

The GBIF lists up to 592 species (as of October 2022).

A

Lejeunea abyssinica 
Lejeunea acanthogona 
Lejeunea acanthotis 
Lejeunea acroloba 
Lejeunea acuminata 
Lejeunea acuta 
Lejeunea acutata 
Lejeunea acutiloba 
Lejeunea adglutinata 
Lejeunea adpressa 
Lejeunea aethiopica 
Lejeunea affinis 
Lejeunea alaskana 
Lejeunea alata 
Lejeunea alatiflora 
Lejeunea albescens 
Lejeunea albida 
Lejeunea albiflora 
Lejeunea aliena 
Lejeunea aloba 
Lejeunea alobifolia 
Lejeunea aloboidea 
Lejeunea amaniensis 
Lejeunea ambigua 
Lejeunea amentulifera 
Lejeunea amoena 
Lejeunea amplectens 
Lejeunea androgyna 
Lejeunea angulifolia 
Lejeunea angusta 
Lejeunea angustibracteata 
Lejeunea anisophylla 
Lejeunea anomala 
Lejeunea antillana 
Lejeunea aphanes 
Lejeunea apiahyna 
Lejeunea apiculata 
Lejeunea aptycta 
Lejeunea aquatica 
Lejeunea arhexia 
Lejeunea armitii 
Lejeunea arnelliana 
Lejeunea artocarpi 
Lejeunea asperifolia 
Lejeunea asperrima 
Lejeunea asperula 
Lejeunea asprella 
Lejeunea assimilis 
Lejeunea asthenica 
Lejeunea atheatostipa 
Lejeunea atlantica 
Lejeunea autoica

B

Lejeunea baccifera 
Lejeunea badia 
Lejeunea balazsii 
Lejeunea barbata 
Lejeunea bermudiana 
Lejeunea bethanica 
Lejeunea bidentula 
Lejeunea biformis 
Lejeunea blepharogona 
Lejeunea blomquistii 
Lejeunea boliviensis 
Lejeunea bombonasensis 
Lejeunea boninensis 
Lejeunea borneensis 
Lejeunea bornmuelleri 
Lejeunea boryana 
Lejeunea brenanii 
Lejeunea bukpuiensis 
Lejeunea byssiformis

C

Lejeunea caespitosa 
Lejeunea calcicola 
Lejeunea calyculata 
Lejeunea camerunensis 
Lejeunea canariensis 
Lejeunea cancellata 
Lejeunea candida 
Lejeunea cantabrigiensis 
Lejeunea capensis 
Lejeunea caracensis 
Lejeunea cardotii 
Lejeunea caripensis 
Lejeunea carolensis 
Lejeunea caroliniana 
Lejeunea catanduana 
Lejeunea catinulifera 
Lejeunea cauapunensis 
Lejeunea caulicalyx 
Lejeunea cavifolia 
Lejeunea caviloba 
Lejeunea cerina 
Lejeunea chaishanensis 
Lejeunea chalmersii 
Lejeunea chamissonis 
Lejeunea chiapae 
Lejeunea chiapasana 
Lejeunea chimborazensis 
Lejeunea chinensis 
Lejeunea cladobola 
Lejeunea cladogyna 
Lejeunea clavata 
Lejeunea clavatiflora 
Lejeunea claviflora 
Lejeunea claviformis 
Lejeunea cochleata 
Lejeunea cocoes 
Lejeunea coffeae 
Lejeunea colensoana 
Lejeunea combuensis 
Lejeunea commixta 
Lejeunea compacta 
Lejeunea compressiuscula 
Lejeunea concava 
Lejeunea concinnula 
Lejeunea conformis 
Lejeunea confusa 
Lejeunea connatistipula 
Lejeunea contracta 
Lejeunea controversa 
Lejeunea convexiloba 
Lejeunea corcovadae 
Lejeunea cordiflora 
Lejeunea cordistipula 
Lejeunea cornutissima 
Lejeunea corralensis 
Lejeunea corynantha 
Lejeunea crassiretis 
Lejeunea crebriflora 
Lejeunea cristulaeflora 
Lejeunea cristulata 
Lejeunea cristuliflora 
Lejeunea cuculliflora 
Lejeunea cuneiflora 
Lejeunea curviloba 
Lejeunea cuspidistipula 
Lejeunea cyanomontana 
Lejeunea cyanophora 
Lejeunea cyathearum 
Lejeunea cyathophora 
Lejeunea cyrtotis

D

Lejeunea debilis 
Lejeunea decidua 
Lejeunea densifolia 
Lejeunea dentata 
Lejeunea denticalyx 
Lejeunea denticuspis 
Lejeunea denudata 
Lejeunea deplanata 
Lejeunea devendrae 
Lejeunea diaphana 
Lejeunea dictyocalyx 
Lejeunea dimorpha 
Lejeunea dipterocarpa 
Lejeunea dipterota 
Lejeunea discreta 
Lejeunea disjecta 
Lejeunea diversicornua 
Lejeunea diversicuspis 
Lejeunea diversifolia 
Lejeunea drehwaldii 
Lejeunea drummondii 
Lejeunea drymophila 
Lejeunea duncaniae 
Lejeunea dusenii

E

Lejeunea ecarinata 
Lejeunea eckloniana 
Lejeunea edentata 
Lejeunea eifrigii 
Lejeunea elegans 
Lejeunea elliottii 
Lejeunea elongata 
Lejeunea elongella 
Lejeunea emarginuliflora 
Lejeunea ensifolia 
Lejeunea epibrya 
Lejeunea epitheta 
Lejeunea eplicata 
Lejeunea erostrata 
Lejeunea erysibe 
Lejeunea estrellamontana 
Lejeunea evansiana 
Lejeunea exilis 
Lejeunea expansa

F

Lejeunea fabroniifolia 
Lejeunea falcata 
Lejeunea fawcettiae 
Lejeunea fernandeziana 
Lejeunea firma 
Lejeunea fissistipula 
Lejeunea flaccida 
Lejeunea flagellaris 
Lejeunea flagellifera 
Lejeunea flava 
Lejeunea flavida 
Lejeunea flavovirens 
Lejeunea fleischeri 
Lejeunea flexuosa 
Lejeunea florida 
Lejeunea floridana 
Lejeunea fulfordiae 
Lejeunea fuliginosa 
Lejeunea fulva 
Lejeunea fusagasugana

G

Lejeunea gabrielensis 
Lejeunea galeata 
Lejeunea gayana 
Lejeunea ghatensis 
Lejeunea gibbiloba 
Lejeunea giulianettii 
Lejeunea glaucescens 
Lejeunea globosiflora 
Lejeunea gomphocalyx 
Lejeunea gottscheana 
Lejeunea gracilicaulis 
Lejeunea gracilis 
Lejeunea gracillima 
Lejeunea gradsteiniana 
Lejeunea gradsteinii 
Lejeunea graminicolor 
Lejeunea grolleana 
Lejeunea grossecristata 
Lejeunea grossiretis 
Lejeunea grossistipula 
Lejeunea grossitexta 
Lejeunea grossiuscula

H

Lejeunea hahnii 
Lejeunea haitica 
Lejeunea halei 
Lejeunea hamatiloba 
Lejeunea hampeana 
Lejeunea hawaikiana 
Lejeunea hebetata 
Lejeunea helenae 
Lejeunea helmsiana 
Lejeunea hepaticola 
Lejeunea herminieri 
Lejeunea herpestica 
Lejeunea herzogii 
Lejeunea heterocheila 
Lejeunea heteromorpha 
Lejeunea heterophylla 
Lejeunea hibernica 
Lejeunea hieronymii 
Lejeunea himalayensis 
Lejeunea hobsoniana 
Lejeunea hodgsoniana 
Lejeunea howeana 
Lejeunea hui 
Lejeunea humefacta 
Lejeunea hyalina 
Lejeunea hygrophila 
Lejeunea hylophila

I/J

Lejeunea ibadana 
Lejeunea immersa 
Lejeunea implexa 
Lejeunea inchoata 
Lejeunea increscens 
Lejeunea indica 
Lejeunea infestans 
Lejeunea inflatiloba 
Lejeunea inflexiloba 
Lejeunea inflexiloba 
Lejeunea intricata 
Lejeunea isophylla 
Lejeunea japonica 
Lejeunea jardinii 
Lejeunea javanensis 
Lejeunea julacea 
Lejeunea jungneri 
Lejeunea juruana

K

Lejeunea kashyapii 
Lejeunea kegelii 
Lejeunea kilimandjarensis 
Lejeunea kinabalensis 
Lejeunea kinabalicola 
Lejeunea kodamae 
Lejeunea kolasibensis 
Lejeunea konosensis 
Lejeunea konratii 
Lejeunea koordersii 
Lejeunea koponenii 
Lejeunea kudremukhensis 
Lejeunea kuerschneriana

L

Lejeunea laeta 
Lejeunea laetevirens 
Lejeunea laevicalyx 
Lejeunea laii 
Lejeunea lamacerina 
Lejeunea latifolia 
Lejeunea latilobula 
Lejeunea laxa 
Lejeunea laxiuscula 
Lejeunea leiantha 
Lejeunea leptalea 
Lejeunea leptantha 
Lejeunea leptocardia 
Lejeunea leptoscypha 
Lejeunea leratii 
Lejeunea letabaensis 
Lejeunea leucophaea 
Lejeunea leucosis 
Lejeunea libertiae 
Lejeunea liliputiana 
Lejeunea limbata 
Lejeunea liromobana 
Lejeunea litoralis 
Lejeunea lomana 
Lejeunea longicollis 
Lejeunea longidentata 
Lejeunea longifissa 
Lejeunea longilobula 
Lejeunea longirostrata 
Lejeunea longirostris 
Lejeunea lowriana 
Lejeunea lumbricoides 
Lejeunea lunatigastria 
Lejeunea lusoria 
Lejeunea luzonensis 
Lejeunea lyncei 
Lejeunea lyratiflora

M

Lejeunea macrocardia 
Lejeunea macrorhyncha 
Lejeunea magohukui 
Lejeunea malangensis 
Lejeunea mandonii 
Lejeunea marasmodes 
Lejeunea maritima 
Lejeunea marsupiifolia 
Lejeunea masoalae 
Lejeunea massalongoana 
Lejeunea megalandra 
Lejeunea megalantha 
Lejeunea megalostipa 
Lejeunea mehrana 
Lejeunea meridensis 
Lejeunea micholitzii 
Lejeunea micro-androecia 
Lejeunea microloba 
Lejeunea microphylla 
Lejeunea microrhegma 
Lejeunea microstipula 
Lejeunea mimula 
Lejeunea minuta 
Lejeunea minutiloba 
Lejeunea minutilobula 
Lejeunea miocenica 
Lejeunea mitracalyx 
Lejeunea mittenii 
Lejeunea mizoramensis 
Lejeunea mizutanii 
Lejeunea molkenboeriana 
Lejeunea monimiae 
Lejeunea monoica 
Lejeunea monticola 
Lejeunea morobensis 
Lejeunea multidentata 
Lejeunea musae 
Lejeunea muscicola 
Lejeunea musicola 
Lejeunea myriandroecia

N

Lejeunea nankaiensis 
Lejeunea nanodes 
Lejeunea neelgherriana 
Lejeunea nemoralis 
Lejeunea nepalensis 
Lejeunea nesiotica 
Lejeunea neumanniana 
Lejeunea nietneri 
Lejeunea nietneri 
Lejeunea nigra 
Lejeunea nilgiriensis 
Lejeunea nipponica 
Lejeunea notata 
Lejeunea novoguineensis 
Lejeunea nymannii

O

Lejeunea obfusca 
Lejeunea obidensis 
Lejeunea oblongifolia 
Lejeunea obscura 
Lejeunea obtusangula 
Lejeunea obtusata 
Lejeunea obtusistipula 
Lejeunea ochracea 
Lejeunea oerstediana 
Lejeunea okomuensis 
Lejeunea oligoclada 
Lejeunea ophiocephala 
Lejeunea oracola 
Lejeunea orbicularis 
Lejeunea osculatiana 
Lejeunea otiana 
Lejeunea ovalifolia

P

Lejeunea pacifica 
Lejeunea pallescens 
Lejeunea pallida 
Lejeunea pallidevirens 
Lejeunea pallidissima 
Lejeunea pandurantha 
Lejeunea papilionacea 
Lejeunea papilionacea 
Lejeunea papuana 
Lejeunea paraensis 
Lejeunea paratropa 
Lejeunea parva 
Lejeunea parviloba 
Lejeunea parvisaccata 
Lejeunea pastasensis 
Lejeunea patagonica 
Lejeunea patellifera 
Lejeunea patens 
Lejeunea patersonii 
Lejeunea patriciae 
Lejeunea paucidentata 
Lejeunea paucispina 
Lejeunea pectinella 
Lejeunea pellucidissima 
Lejeunea pentotantha 
Lejeunea perigonialis 
Lejeunea perpapillosa 
Lejeunea pertusa 
Lejeunea pfleidereri 
Lejeunea phyllobola  
Lejeunea pilifera 
Lejeunea piriformis 
Lejeunea planiloba 
Lejeunea platyceras 
Lejeunea plumula 
Lejeunea pocsii 
Lejeunea polilloensis 
Lejeunea polyantha 
Lejeunea polyploca 
Lejeunea praetervisa 
Lejeunea primordialis 
Lejeunea princeps 
Lejeunea prionoides 
Lejeunea proboscidea 
Lejeunea procumbens 
Lejeunea proliferans 
Lejeunea prominula 
Lejeunea propagulifera }
Lejeunea prorepens 
Lejeunea pteridis 
Lejeunea pterigonia 
Lejeunea ptosimophylla 
Lejeunea puiggariana 
Lejeunea pulchra 
Lejeunea pulchriflora  
Lejeunea pulverulenta 
Lejeunea pulvinata 
Lejeunea pusilla

Q

Lejeunea quinqueumbonata 
Lejeunea quintasii

R

Lejeunea raddiana 
Lejeunea radicans 
Lejeunea ramosissima 
Lejeunea ramulosa 
Lejeunea rara 
Lejeunea ravenelii 
Lejeunea recurva 
Lejeunea reflexistipula 
Lejeunea reinerae 
Lejeunea remotifolia 
Lejeunea renistipula 
Lejeunea resonate 
Lejeunea resupinata 
Lejeunea reticulata 
Lejeunea retifolia 
Lejeunea rhigophila 
Lejeunea rhodesiae 
Lejeunea rionegrensis 
Lejeunea riparia 
Lejeunea rodriguezii 
Lejeunea roseo-alba 
Lejeunea rothii 
Lejeunea rotundifolia 
Lejeunea rufopellucida 
Lejeunea ruthii

S

Lejeunea sanctae-helenae 
Lejeunea scabriflora 
Lejeunea scabrifolia 
Lejeunea scalaris 
Lejeunea schiffneri 
Lejeunea schimperi 
Lejeunea schusteri 
Lejeunea semiscabrida 
Lejeunea semperi 
Lejeunea seriata 
Lejeunea serpillifolioides 
Lejeunea sessiliflora 
Lejeunea setacea 
Lejeunea setiloba 
Lejeunea sharpii 
Lejeunea siccata 
Lejeunea sikorae 
Lejeunea silvatica 
Lejeunea sinclairii 
Lejeunea smaragdina 
Lejeunea soae 
Lejeunea solanicola 
Lejeunea sordida 
Lejeunea sphaerphora 
Lejeunea spiniloba 
Lejeunea spinuliflora 
Lejeunea splendida 
Lejeunea spongia 
Lejeunea sporadica 
Lejeunea spruce 
Lejeunea squarrosa 
Lejeunea squarrosula 
Lejeunea srivastavae 
Lejeunea stenodentata 
Lejeunea stephaniana 
Lejeunea stevensiana 
Lejeunea streimannii 
Lejeunea suaveolens 
Lejeunea subacuta 
Lejeunea subaquatica 
Lejeunea subbifida 
Lejeunea subelobata 
Lejeunea subigiensis 
Lejeunea subolivacea 
Lejeunea subpililoba 
Lejeunea subplana 
Lejeunea subrufula 
Lejeunea subsessilis 
Lejeunea subspathulata 
Lejeunea succulenta 
Lejeunea suffruticola 
Lejeunea sulphurea 
Lejeunea syoshii

T

Lejeunea talamancensis 
 Lejeunea tamasii 
 Lejeunea tamaspocsii 
 Lejeunea tapajosensis 
 Lejeunea tarapotensis 
 Lejeunea tenax 
 Lejeunea tenella 
 Lejeunea tenera 
 Lejeunea terminalis 
 Lejeunea terricola 
 Lejeunea thallophora 
 Lejeunea tjibodensis 
 Lejeunea tonduzana 
 Lejeunea topoensis 
 Lejeunea tosana 
 Lejeunea touwii 
 Lejeunea trachygona 
 Lejeunea triangulata 
 Lejeunea trinitensis 
 Lejeunea trochantha 
 Lejeunea trukensis 
 Lejeunea truncatiloba 
 Lejeunea truncatula 
 Lejeunea tuberculiflora 
 Lejeunea tuberculosa 
 Lejeunea tumida 
 Lejeunea tunquiniensis 
 Lejeunea turbinifera 
 Lejeunea tutuilana

U

 Lejeunea uleana 
 Lejeunea umbilicata 
 Lejeunea ungulata 
 Lejeunea urbanii 
 Lejeunea urbanioides 
 Lejeunea utriculata 
 Lejeunea uvifera

V

 Lejeunea vagans 
 Lejeunea vaginata 
 Lejeunea venezuelana 
 Lejeunea ventricosa 
 Lejeunea vesicata 
 Lejeunea villaumei 
 Lejeunea viridis 
 Lejeunea vojtkoi 
 Lejeunea vulgariformis

W

 Lejeunea wallichiana 
 Lejeunea wattsiana 
 Lejeunea weigeltii 
 Lejeunea wichurae 
 Lejeunea wightii 
 Lejeunea wilmsii

X

Lejeunea xiphophylla 
 Lejeunea xiphotis

Z

Lejeunea zacuapana

Other related genera
 Oryzolejeunea antillana 
 Ptycholejeunea nietneri 
 Stylolejeunea trinitensis

References

External links

Lejeunea
Lejeuneaceae